Fernando Colunga Olivares (born 3 March 1966) is a Mexican actor best known for his work in Mexican telenovelas.

Colunga gained international fame for playing Luis Fernando de la Vega in the Mexican soap opera Maria la del Barrio. He is also known for his roles as Manuel Fuentes-Guerra in the historical drama set in the Mexican post-independence period of the mid-19th century, Real love, and for playing Jesús García in Porque el amor manda. He received his drama education at Centro de Educación Artística de Televisa (CEA) in Mexico City.

Career 
Colunga worked as an actor in 1988, when he debuted twice as Eduardo Yañez's stuntman in the soap opera Dulce Desafío. After that, he decided to start his acting career and enrolled in the Centro de Educación Artística de Televisa in 1990. In his early career, he was known to many audiences for his role in the Mexican version of Sesame Street. Colunga also starred in other shows, such as The Web, Marked Time, and All Of It.

He starred in telenovelas, including Cenizas y Diamantes, Madres Egoístas and Maria Mercedes. Carla Estrada offered him a role in the soap opera, Más Allá del Puente, together with Maria Sorté in 1993-1994. After this telenovela, Colunga played a role in Marimar. In 1994, the film Kiss Me On The Mouth featuring Colunga and Paulina Rubio, was shown in the cinema. In 1995, Colunga played the role of Lieutenant Raul Gutierrez in Alondra, a period novel produced by Carla Estrada. He acted alongside Veronica Merchant, Gonzalo Vega, Ernesto Laguardia, Marga Lopez, Ana Colchero, Juan Manuel Bernal, Beatriz Sheridan, and Eric del Castillo.

In 1995-1996, Colunga got his first starring role with Thalía in the telenovela, Maria la del Barrio, giving life to Luis Fernando de la Vega. With this telenovela, Colunga began to be known internationally.

He later starred in Esmeralda (1997) with Leticia Calderon, seen in countries as disparate as Indonesia and the Czech Republic. After the success of Esmeralda, he made a foray into theater with Original Sin Not where he starred with Chantal Andere, as Jenny and Bill, in an unhappy marriage in the process of destruction. His next show was in 1998, La Usurpadora, with Venezuelan actress Gabriela Spanic, Juan Pablo Gamboa, Chantal Andere, Alejandro Ruiz, Enrique Lizalde and Dominika Paleta. He played Carlos Daniel Bracho, a man who knows that the usurper, Paulina, has replaced his wife Paola, and is being blackmailed for it.

His next telenovela were Nunce Te Olvidare (1999) by Edith Gonzalez and Abrazame Muy Fuerte (2000) with Aracely Arambula, Victoria Ruffo, Cesar Evora and Nailea Norvind. After this, he spent time away from telenovelas to study acting and production. He also played a role in Navidad Sin Fin in 2001. In 2003, he worked in Amor Real with Adela Noriega; a production of Carla Estrada, where he played Manuel Fuentes Guerra, the bastard son of a rich landowner. He starred alongside Mauricio Islas and Helena Rojo. In 2003, he won the TVyNovelas Award for Best Actor. After Amor Real, Colunga took some time from TV acting and concentrated on theater. Along with César Evora, he adapted screenplays and launched Death Trap.

After spending several months touring with his work, Colunga returned to television with the telenovela of Carla Estrada, Alborada (2005) and Passion (2007).  He shared the stage with actors like Valentino Lanús, Daniela Romo, Mariana Garza, Luis Roberto Guzmán, Vanessa Guzman, Arturo Peniche, Irán Castillo, Susana González, Sebastián Rulli, and Daniela Castro.

In 2008, he worked on the telenovela Manana Es Para Siempre sharing credits with Silvia Navarro and Lucero. This telenovela is produced by Nicando Diaz, in which he plays Eduardo Juarez, a man who, for his revenge against Barbara Greco (Lucero) changes his name to Franco Santoro. In 2010, he was the star of the telenovela Soy Tu Dueña produced by Nicandro Diaz; he shared credit with Lucero, Gabriela Spanic, and Jacqueline Andere.

In 2012, he starred in Porque el Amor Manda with Blanca Soto, Erick Elias, and Claudia Alvarez, debuting in the genre of telenovela with a comic touch. Porque el Amor Manda is a Mexican telenovela produced by Juan Osorio. It was an adaptation of the 2011 Secretary. This starred Colunga and Blanca Soto, with Erick Elias and Claudia Alvarez, who play the main antagonists of the story.

In 2015, he worked on the telenovela Pasión y Poder sharing credits with Jorge Salinas and Susana González.

Filmography

Films

Television performances

See also
 TVyNovelas Award for Best Lead Actor

References

External links
 
 Fernando Colunga at the Internet Movie Database

1966 births
Living people
Mexican male film actors
Mexican male telenovela actors
Male actors from Mexico City
Naturalized citizens of the United States